Elina Lampela (born 18 February 1998) is a Finnish athlete who competes in the pole vault.

Career
In July 2021 Lampela was confirmed as part of the Finnish team for the delayed 2020 Summer Olympics in Tokyo. 

In 2022 Lampela took part in the World Championships in Eugene, Oregon and the European Championships in Munich. She qualified for the final in Munich and finished eleventh overall.

Lampela competed at the 2023 European Athletics Indoor Championships.

Personal life
Lampela moved from Oulu in northern Finland to Helsinki in 2018 and lives in Viikki. Lampela is studying molecular bioscience at the University of Helsinki.

References

External links
 

Living people
1998 births
Finnish female pole vaulters
Athletes (track and field) at the 2020 Summer Olympics
Olympic athletes of Finland
20th-century Finnish women
21st-century Finnish women